Peter Bayley may refer to:

 Peter Bayley (poet) ( 1778–1823), English writer and poet
 Peter Bayley (cricketer) (1916–1996), West Indian cricketer from British Guiana
 Peter Bayley (literary critic) (1921–2015), British academic, fellow in English at University College, Oxford
 Peter Bayley (scholar of French literature) (1944–2018), British academic of French literature

See also
Peter Bailey (disambiguation)
Peter Baillie (1771–1811), British merchant